The Heatin' System is a double album by organist Jack McDuff recorded in 1971 which was his fourth release on the Cadet label and the first following his stint with Blue Note.

Reception
The Allmusic site awarded the album 4 stars.

Track listing 
All compositions by Jack McDuff except as indicated
 "The Heatin' System" - 12:25   
 "Elmo Tucker" - 6:00   
 "The Boiler" - 10:42   
 "The Prophet" (Alfred Ellis) - 4:12   
 "Pressure Gauge" - 10:34   
 "Lonesome Is the Night" - 6:39   
 "Ain't No Sunshine" (Bill Withers) - 8:33   
 "Radiation" (McDuff, J. J. Jackson) - 10:19

Personnel 
Jack McDuff - organ, piano, melodica
Bobby Alston - trumpet
Don Myrick, David Young - tenor saxophone, flute
Marty Roberts - guitar
Phil Upchurch -  electric bass (tracks 1, 3-5, 7 & 8)
Sam Jones - bass (tracks 2 & 6)
Greg Williams - drums
Frederick Walker - congas

References 

 

Jack McDuff albums
1972 albums
Cadet Records albums
Albums produced by Esmond Edwards